David Colijns (1582–c.1665) was a Dutch Golden Age painter.

Biography
Colijns was born in Rotterdam.  According to Houbraken he painted historical allegories from the bible, especially with a great many figures.

According to the RKD he was the son of Chrispiaen Colijn and in 1621 he became the teacher of Salomon Koninck, and later of Jacob Koninck (ca. 1615-ca.1695). Several religious paintings by his hand hang in the Centraal Museum.  He died in Amsterdam.

References

The ascension of Elijah in the Rijksmuseum

1582 births
1665 deaths
Dutch Golden Age painters
Dutch male painters
Painters from Rotterdam